Karen Brødsgaard (born 10 March 1978 in Horsens, Midtjylland) is a former Danish team handball player, two times Olympic champion and the current head coach of Odense Håndbold. She received gold medals with the Danish national team at the 2000 Summer Olympics in Sydney and at the 2004 Summer Olympics in Athens.

References

External links

1978 births
Living people
Danish female handball players
Olympic gold medalists for Denmark
Handball players at the 2000 Summer Olympics
Handball players at the 2004 Summer Olympics
Viborg HK players
Olympic medalists in handball
Medalists at the 2004 Summer Olympics
Medalists at the 2000 Summer Olympics
People from Horsens
Sportspeople from the Central Denmark Region